Lindsey Hopkins Jr. (March 10, 1908 - February 14, 1986) was born in Greensboro, North Carolina. He built a career in commercial and industrial banking, owning homes in Miami and Atlanta, where he had close ties to Coca-Cola. He also owned a chain of hotels in the Bahamas.

Early life 
Lindsey Hopkins Jr. was born in Greensboro, North Carolina in 1908. His father was the American businessman and philanthropist Lindsey Hopkins Sr.

Lindsey Hopkins Jr. attended the University of Georgia.

Mr. Hopkins was married to Dorothy Smith Hopkins, who was an accomplished pianist.

Business Activities

Racing
Lindsey Hopkins Jr. was an American sportsman car owner who continued entering cars at Indianapolis 500 races even when he could not obtain sponsorships. Through the years, Hopkins's entries did not always carry sponsorship nor did they need to as he was purported to be the second largest Coca-Cola stockholder but as costs of racing increased through the years, Hopkins found sponsors. A regular from 1951 through 1982, fielding as many as four cars in some years, he won 11 American Automobile Association or United States Auto Club National Championship races. In 1971 the Hopkins team used a Kuzma rear engine chassis modified by the Kenyon brothers powered by a turbocharged Ford engine.

Lindsey Hopkins’ first Indianapolis 500 car was a dirt track machine obtained from Lou Moore in June 1950. Henry Banks drove it to that year's American Automobile Association National title as well as to second place in 1951.

Longtime Lindsey Hopkins Racing driver Roger McCluskey won the 1972 Ontario 500 in Ontario, California, and the United States Auto Club National Championship in 1973. Hopkins's team of drivers included Jim Rathmann (second at Indianapolis in 1957 and 1959), Bill Vukovich, A. J. Foyt, Lloyd Ruby, Bobby Marshman, Don Branson, Tony Bettenhausen, Gary Bettenhausen, Wally Dallenbach, Pat O’Connor, and George Amick, among numerous others. He was inducted into the Indy 500 Hall of Fame.

Lindsey Hopkins continued to live up to his role as a gentleman sportsman as he entered cars in the Indianapolis 500 up until his death in February 1986. Through the years, Hopkins never won the ‘500,’ and was touched by tragedy several times, first when Bill Vukovich died in 1955 behind the wheel of the Hopkins Special while leading the Indianapolis ‘500.’  However, even his friend Bill's death has not dimmed Lindsey Hopkins’ appetite for racing. In his words: “Bill wouldn’t have wanted me to quit”.In addition, Hopkins was an accomplished amateur magician. As a result, his cars featured a logo of a top hat and “Thurston” the rabbit.

IndyCar wins

Football

Auto racing was not Lindsey's only interest. In 1967 he and fellow car owner John Mecom Jr bought the new franchise of the New Orleans Saints football team. He was also part owner of the Atlanta Falcons.

Coca-Cola Company
Lindsey Hopkins Jr. was elected to the board of the Coca-Cola Co. in March 1954 and filled the vacancy resulting from the death of Mrs. Lettle P. Evans.

Real Estate
Lindsey Hopkins Jr. was President of Montauk Beach Company Inc. Mr. Hopkins was also head of a corporation which owned and operated Coral Harbour, multi-million dollar club and residential development in the Bahamas.

Banking

Lindsey Hopkins Jr. founded Security Trust Company in 1938, which held the majority of the common stock and all of the preferred stock in the Montauk Beach Company. The firm provided trust and estate management services, but was not engaged in commercial banking functions. Security Trust Company was acquired by Nortrust Corp. of Chicago in December 1971 and became Northern Trust Bank of Florida.

Roosevelt Hotel Miami (Lindsey Hopkins Technical College)
The construction of Roosevelt Hotel was started by Fred Rand, which was slated to be a $2,750,000 Hotel, and was supposed to have 560 rooms. However, the Roosevelt Hotel Project was left unfinished in 1926, and its unfinished walls and rude interior furnished a haven for hobos and the homeless of 10 years, while two hurricanes did their unsuccessful best to ruin it.

In 1936 the Roosevelt Hotel was acquired by Lindsey Hopkins Sr., Lindsey Hopkins Jr.'s father to both repair and finish. Over one million dollars was spent to complete the Roosevelt Hotel.

Upon the passing of Lindsey Hopkins Sr., the building was sold for only $225,000 dollars to the Miami Dade Public Schools by Lindsey Hopkins Jr. and renamed in honor of his father. Located in the heart of Miami's "Healthcare District", it is now known as Lindsey Hopkins Technical College.

References

American auto racing teams
1908 births
Place of birth missing
1986 deaths
Place of death missing
American motorsport people
Indianapolis 500
20th-century philanthropists